Notre Dame of Banga is a Catholic school located in Banga, South Cotabato, Philippines. It was started in by the Oblates of Mary Immaculate in 1952., and was transferred to the Augustinian Recollect sisters on May 11, 1956 through the request of Bishop Gerard Mongeau. Its present school head is Sr. Ma. Crisanta A. Armendez, AR. The school covers the elementary, junior high school, and senior high school years.

Brief History

External links 
http://ndbanga.webs.com - the Notre Dame of Banga Website
Official Website of the Augustinian Recollect Sisters
http://www.notredameofbanga.isgreat.org-NDB alumni site 1

References 

Schools in South Cotabato
Catholic secondary schools in the Philippines
Notre Dame Educational Association